The men's team trap shooting competition was one of 15 shooting sports events on the Shooting at the 1908 Summer Olympics programme.  Teams consisted of six shooters.  Shooting was conducted in three rounds, with each shooter firing at 30 clay birds in the first, 25 in the second, and 50 in the third.

Each nation could enter up to 2 teams of 6 shooters. Great Britain entered two teams, with Canada and the Netherlands also entering a team each.  Belgium, France, and Sweden initially registered teams, but their teams did not compete.  The Dutch team was eliminated before the final round.

Results

References

Sources
 
 

Men's trap team